FC Nantes won Division 1 season 1972/1973 of the French Association Football League with 55 points.

Participating teams

 AC Ajaccio
 Angers SCO
 SEC Bastia
 Bordeaux
 Olympique Lyonnais
 Olympique de Marseille
 FC Metz
 AS Nancy
 FC Nantes
 OGC Nice
 Nîmes Olympique
 Paris FC
 Red Star Paris
 Stade de Reims
 Stade Rennais FC
 AS Saint-Etienne
 CS Sedan
 FC Sochaux-Montbéliard
 RC Strasbourg
 US Valenciennes-Anzin

League table

Promoted from Division 2, who will play in Division 1 season 1973/1974
 RC Lens: Champion of Division 2, winner of Division 2 group A
 Troyes AF: Runner-up, winner of Division 2 group B
 AS Monaco: Third place, winner of barrages

Results

Top goalscorers

References

 Division 1 season 1972-1973 at pari-et-gagne.com

Ligue 1 seasons
French
1